Patia orise is a butterfly in the family Pieridae. It is found from Costa Rica to Brazil and the Guyanas.

Description
It is very similar to Thyridia psidii and Methona confusa, especially in the female. The perfectly transparent wings have a black margin and black median band, which, however, in the male only reaches the middle of the wing on account of the scent-scale on the anterior half of the hindwing.

Subspecies
The following subspecies are recognised:
Patia orise orise (French Guiana)
Patia orise denigrata (Rosenberg & Talbot, 1914) (Peru, Colombia)

References

Dismorphiinae
Butterflies described in 1836
Fauna of Brazil
Pieridae of South America
Taxa named by Jean Baptiste Boisduval